Kacey may refer to:
Kate & Kacey, American country music duo
"Kacey Talk", a song by American rapper YoungBoy Never Broke Again

People
Kacey Ainsworth (born 1968), English actress
Kacey Barnfield (born 1988), English actress
Kacey Bellamy (born 1987), American ice hockey defenseman
Kacey Jones (1950–2016), American singer-songwriter, producer, and humorist
Kacey Musgraves (born 1988), American country music singer
Kacey White (born 1984), American soccer midfielder

See also

Karey (disambiguation)
Kvitka Cisyk (1953–1998), Ukrainian operatic soprano and symphonic folk singer
KC (disambiguation)